Donald Arld Veller (May 20, 1912 – November 10, 2006) was an American football player and coach of football and golf.  He served as the head football coach at Hanover College in 1946 and at Florida State University from 1948 to 1952, compiling a career college football record of 35–15–1.  Veller died at the age of 94 on November 10, 2006 in Tallahassee, Florida.

Head coaching record

College football

References

External links
 

1912 births
2006 deaths
American football halfbacks
Florida State Seminoles football coaches
Hanover Panthers football coaches
Indiana Hoosiers football coaches
Indiana Hoosiers football players
College golf coaches in the United States
High school football coaches in Indiana
People from Knox County, Indiana